The men's 100 metres at the 1971 European Athletics Championships was held in Helsinki, Finland, at Helsinki Olympic Stadium on 10 and 11 August 1971.

Medalists

Results

Final
11 August
Wind: -1.3 m/s

Semi-finals
11 August

Semi-final 1
Wind: 0 m/s

Semi-final 2
Wind: 0 m/s

Heats
10 August

Heat 1
Wind: -1.6 m/s

Heat 2
Wind: -1.3 m/s

Heat 3
Wind: -0.2 m/s

Heat 4
Wind: 0 m/s

Participation
According to an unofficial count, 29 athletes from 18 countries participated in the event.

 (3)
 (1)
 (3)
 (1)
 (3)
 (1)
 (1)
 (1)
 (1)
 (3)
 (1)
 (2)
 (1)
 (1)
 (1)
 (1)
 (1)
 (3)

References

100 metres
100 metres at the European Athletics Championships